This is a list of primary immunodeficiencies (PID), which are immune deficiencies that are not secondary to another condition.

The International Union of Immunological Societies recognizes nine classes of primary immunodeficiencies, totaling approximately 430 conditions. A 2014 update of the classification guide added a 9th category and added 30 new gene defects from the prior 2009 version. The most recent classification was released in 2019. The number of identified conditions continues to grow over time as more research is done. 

The impact of primary immunodeficiencies ranges from mild to severe based on the condition.

Combined T and B–cell immunodeficiencies

In these disorders both T lymphocytes and often B lymphocytes, regulators of adaptive immunity, are dysfunctional or decreased in number. The main members are various types of severe combined immunodeficiency (SCID).
 T-/B+ SCID (T cells predominantly absent): 
γc deficiency
 JAK3 deficiency
 Interleukin-7 receptor-α deficiency
 CD45 deficiency
 CD3δ, CD3ε, or CD3ζ deficiency
 Coronin-1A deficiency
 LAT (gene) deficiency
 T-/B- SCID (both T and B cells absent)
 RAG 1/2 deficiency
 DCLRE1C (Artemis) deficiency
 XLF (protein)/Cernunnos deficiency
 DNA PKcs deficiency
 DNA ligase type IV deficiency
 adenosine deaminase (ADA) deficiency
 reticular dysgenesis
 Omenn syndrome
 CD40 ligand deficiency
 CD40 deficiency
 CD3γ deficiency
 CD8 deficiency
ICOS deficiency
 ZAP70 deficiency
 Ca++ channel deficiency
 MHC class I deficiency (with mutations in TAP1, TAP2, TAPBP, or B2M)
 MHC class II deficiency (with mutations in CIITA, RFXANK, RFX5, or RFXAP)
 CD25 deficiency
 CD27 deficiency
 STAT5b deficiency
 ITK deficiency
 SH2D1A deficiency (XLP1)
 MAGT1 deficiency
DOCK2 deficiency
 DOCK8 deficiency
 RhoH deficiency
 Activated PI3K delta syndrome
 MALT1 deficiency
 BCL10 deficiency
BCL11B deficiency
 CARD11 deficiency
 MST1 deficiency
 TCRα deficiency
 LCK deficiency
IL-21 deficiency
 IL-21R deficiency
 UNC119 deficiency
NIK deficiency
 OX40 deficiency
 IKBKB deficiency
TFRC deficiency
Moesin deficiency
RELB deficiency
 Cartilage hair hypoplasia
 LRBA deficiency

Predominantly antibody deficiencies 
In primary antibody deficiencies, one or more isotypes of immunoglobulin are decreased or don't function properly. These proteins, generated by plasma cells, normally bind to pathogens, targeting them for destruction.
 Absent B cells with a resultant severe reduction of all types of antibody: X-linked agammaglobulinemia (btk deficiency, or Bruton's agammaglobulinemia), μ-Heavy chain deficiency, l 5 deficiency, Igα deficiency, BLNK deficiency, thymoma with immunodeficiency
 B cells low but present or normal, but with reduction in 2 or more isotypes (usually IgG & IgA, sometimes IgM): common variable immunodeficiency (CVID), CD19 deficiency, TACI (TNFRSF13B) deficiency, BAFF receptor deficiency.
 Normal numbers of B cells with decreased IgG and IgA and increased IgM: Hyper-IgM syndromes
 Normal numbers of B cells with isotype or light chain deficiencies: heavy chain deletions, kappa chain deficiency, isolated IgG subclass deficiency, IgA with IgG subclass deficiency, selective immunoglobulin A deficiency
 Specific antibody deficiency to specific antigens with normal B cell and normal Ig concentrations
 Transient hypogammaglobulinemia of infancy (THI)

Other well defined immunodeficiency syndrome
A number of syndromes escape formal classification but are otherwise recognizable by particular clinical or immunological features.
 Immunodeficiency with thrombocytopenia
Wiskott–Aldrich syndrome
WIP deficiency
ARPC1B deficiency
 DNA repair defects not causing isolated SCID: 
Ataxia-telangiectasia
Ataxia-like syndrome
Nijmegen breakage syndrome
Bloom syndrome
Immunodeficiency–centromeric instability–facial anomalies syndrome (ICF1, 2, 3, and 4)
PMS2 deficiency
RIDDLE syndrome (RNF168 deficiency)
MCM4 deficiency
FILS syndrome (POLE deficiency)
POLE2 deficiency
LIG1 deficiency
NSMCE3 deficiency
Hebo deficiency
GINS1 deficiency
 DiGeorge syndrome (when associated with thymic defects)
TBX1 deficiency
CHARGE syndrome (CHD7 deficiency or SEMA3E deficiency)
Winged helix/FOXN1 deficiency
Chromosome 10p13-p14 deletion
 Immuno-osseous dysplasias (abnormal development of the skeleton with immune problems): 
Cartilage–hair hypoplasia
Schimke syndrome
MYSM1 deficiency
MOPD1 deficiency
EXTL3 deficiency
 Hyper IgE syndromes
Job syndrome (STAT3 deficiency)
Comel-Netherton syndrome
PGM3 deficiency
Hypohidrotic ectodermal dysplasia
NEMO deficiency
IKBA deficiency
 Calcium channel defects
ORAI1 deficiency
STIM1 deficiency
Transcobalamin 2 deficiency
Immunodeficiency with multiple intestinal atresias (TTC7A deficiency)
Hepatic venoocclusive disease with immunodeficiency (VODI)
Vici syndrome
Purine nucleoside phosphorylase (PNP) deficiency
 AR-DKC (autosomal dominant dyskeratosis congenital) 
 Hermansky–Pudlak syndrome type 2
 Chronic mucocutaneous candidiasis
HOIL1 deficiency
HOIP deficiency
 XL-dyskeratosis congenita (Hoyeraal-Hreidarsson syndrome)
Hennekam lymphangiectasia-lymphedema syndrome
Kabuki syndrome
 MTHFD1 deficiency
 STAT5b deficiency
IKAROS deficiency

Diseases of immune dysregulation
In certain conditions, the regulation rather than the intrinsic activity of parts of the immune system is the predominant problem.
 Immunodeficiency with hypopigmentation or albinism: Chédiak–Higashi syndrome, Griscelli syndrome type 2
 Familial hemophagocytic lymphohistiocytosis: perforin deficiency, UNC13D deficiency, syntaxin 11 deficiency
 X-linked lymphoproliferative syndrome
 Syndromes with autoimmunity:
 (a) Autoimmune lymphoproliferative syndrome: type 1a (CD95 defects), type 1b (Fas ligand defects), type 2a (CASP10 defects), type 2b (CASP8 defects)
 (b) APECED (autoimmune polyendocrinopathy with candidiasis and ectodermal dystrophy)
 (c) IPEX (immunodysregulation polyendocrinopathy enteropathy X-linked syndrome)
 (d) CD25 deficiency

Congenital defects of phagocyte number, function, or both
Phagocytes are the cells that engulf and ingest pathogens (phagocytosis), and destroy them with chemicals. Monocytes/macrophages as well as granulocytes are capable of this process. In certain conditions, either the number of phagocytes is reduced or their functional capacity is impaired.
 Severe Congenital Neutropenia: due to ELA2 deficiency (with myelodysplasia)
 Severe Congenital Neutropenia: due to GFI1 deficiency (with T/B lymphopenia)
Elastase deficiency
Kostmann syndrome (HAX1 deficiency)
 Neutropenia with cardiac and urogenital malformations
 Glycogen storage disease type 1b
Cohen syndrome
Clericuzio syndrome
 Cyclic neutropenia
 X-linked neutropenia/myelodysplasia
 P14 deficiency
HYOU1 deficiency
JAGN1 deficiency
SMARCD2 deficiency
3-Methylglutaconic aciduria
Leukocyte adhesion deficiency type 1
 Leukocyte adhesion deficiency type 2
 Leukocyte adhesion deficiency type 3
 RAC2 deficiency (Neutrophil immunodeficiency syndrome)
 Beta-actin deficiency
G-CSF-receptor deficiency
 Localized juvenile periodontitis
 Papillon–Lefèvre syndrome
 Specific granule deficiency
 Shwachman–Diamond syndrome
WDR1 deficiency
Cystic fibrosis
 Chronic granulomatous disease: X-linked or autosomal (CYBA, NCF1, NCF2, NCF4)
 IL-12 and IL-23 β1 chain deficiency
 IL-12p40 deficiency
Glucose-6-phosphate dehydrogenase deficiency class 1
 Interferon γ receptor 1 deficiency
 Interferon γ receptor 2 deficiency
 STAT1 deficiency
MKL1 deficiency
 AD hyper-IgE
 AR hyper-IgE
 Pulmonary alveolar proteinosis
MonoMac syndrome (GATA2 deficiency)

Defects in innate immunity
Several rare conditions are due to defects in the innate immune system, which is a basic line of defense that is independent of the more advanced lymphocyte-related systems. Many of these conditions are associated with skin problems.

Interleukin 12 receptor, beta 1 deficiency
IL-12p40 deficiency
Interferon gamma receptor 1 deficiency
Interferon gamma receptor 2 deficiency
Tyk2 deficiency
JAK1 loss-of-function
ISG15 deficiency
RORc deficiency
STAT1 deficiency, gain-of-function mutation
STAT2 deficiency
IRF7 deficiency
CD16 deficiency
IRF8 deficiency
IFNAR2 deficiency
TLR pathway deficiencies
IRAK4 deficiency
IRAK1 deficiency
MyD88 deficiency
TIRAP deficiency
MDA5 deficiency
Epidermodysplasia verruciformis
WHIM syndrome (warts, hypogammaglobulinaemia, infections, myelokathexis)
EVER1 and EVER2 deficiency
Herpes simplex encephalitis
TLR3 deficiency
TRAF3 deficiency
TRIF deficiency
TBK1 deficiency
IRF3 deficiency
 CARD9 deficiency
Chronic mucocutaneous candidiasis
IL17RA or IL17RC deficiency
 Trypanosomiasis
RPSA deficiency with congenital asplenia
HMOX deficiency with congenital asplenia
CLCN7 deficiency with osteoporosis
OSTM1 deficiency with osteoporosis
Hidradenitis suppurativa

Autoinflammatory disorders
Rather than predisposing for infections, most of the autoinflammatory disorders lead to excessive inflammation. Many manifest themselves as periodic fever syndromes. They may involve various organs directly, as well as predisposing for long-term damage (e.g. by leading to amyloid deposition).
 Familial Mediterranean fever
Aicardi–Goutières syndrome with TREX1, SAMHD1 or IFIH1 mutations
Spondyloenchondro-dysplasia with immune dysregulation (ACP5 mutation)
STING-associated vasculopathy with onset in infancy
X-linked reticulate pigmentary disorder
USP18 deficiency
CANDLE (Chronic atypical neutrophilic dermatitis with lipodystrophy)
Singleton-Merten syndrome
 TNF receptor associated periodic syndrome (TRAPS)
 Hyper-IgD syndrome (Mevalonate kinase deficiency)
 CIAS1-related diseases:
Muckle–Wells syndrome
 Familial cold autoinflammatory syndrome, types 1, 2, 3, and 4
 Neonatal onset multisystem inflammatory disease
NLRP1 deficiency
 PAPA syndrome (pyogenic sterile arthritis, pyoderma gangrenosum, acne)
ADAM17 deficiency
 Blau syndrome
Majeed syndrome (Chronic recurrent multifocal osteomyelitis and congenital dyserythropoietic anemia)
 DIRA (deficiency of the IL-1 receptor antagonist)
DITRA (deficiency of IL-36 receptor antagonist)
CARD14 mediated psoriasis (CAMPS)
Cherubism
COPA defect
Otulipenia/ORAS

Complement deficiencies
The complement system is part of the innate as well as the adaptive immune system; it is a group of circulating proteins that can bind pathogens and form a membrane attack complex. Complement deficiencies are the result of a lack of any of these proteins. They may predispose to infections but also to autoimmune conditions.
 C1q deficiency (lupus-like syndrome, rheumatoid disease, infections)
 C1r deficiency (idem)
 C1s deficiency
 C4 deficiency (lupus-like syndrome)
 C2 deficiency (lupus-like syndrome, vasculitis, polymyositis, pyogenic infections)
 C3 deficiency (recurrent pyogenic infections)
 C5 deficiency (Neisserial infections, SLE)
 C6 deficiency (idem)
 C7 deficiency (idem, vasculitis)
 C8a deficiency 
 C8b deficiency 
 C9 deficiency (Neisserial infections)
 C1-inhibitor deficiency (hereditary angioedema)
 Factor I deficiency (pyogenic infections)
 Factor H deficiency (haemolytic-uraemic syndrome, membranoproliferative glomerulonephritis)
 Factor D deficiency (Neisserial infections)
 Properdin deficiency (Neisserial infections)
 MBP deficiency (pyogenic infections)
 MASP2 deficiency
Complement receptor 3 deficiency
 Membrane cofactor protein (CD46) deficiency
 Membrane attack complex inhibitor (CD59) deficiency
 Paroxysmal nocturnal hemoglobinuria
Ficolin 3 deficiency
Properdin deficiency
Factor I deficiency
Factor H deficiency
Thrombomodulin deficiency
CHAPEL disease

Phenocopies of primary immune deficiencies

 Autoimmune lymphoproliferative syndrome
 RAS-associated autoimmune leukoproliferative disorder
 Large granular lymphocytosis
 Atypical hemolytic uremic syndrome
 Good syndrome

References 

Immunodeficiency